Shane Profitt is an American country music singer. He made his debut in 2022 with the single "How It Oughta Be".

Biography
Shane Profitt was born in Columbia, Tennessee.

Profitt began playing guitar in 2018 when his grandfather gave him one for Christmas. After this, he began learning to perform cover songs at local venues in addition to writing his own material. After encountering a woman at a guitar store, he took her on a date to a sushi restaurant where he met country music singer Chris Janson and his wife, Kelly, who is also his manager. The Jansons signed Profitt to a songwriting contract, which led to Janson recording two of his songs on his 2021 album All In. He also selected Profitt as an opening act on his Halfway to Crazy tour.

This led to Profitt signing with Big Machine Records along with Janson's imprint label, Harpeth 60 Records, in 2022. The label released his debut extended play Maury County Line that August, along with lead single "How It Oughta Be". In February 2023, "How It Oughta Be" reached number 19 on Billboard Country Airplay.

Discography

Extended plays

Singles

References

American country singer-songwriters
American male singers
Big Machine Records artists
Country musicians from Tennessee
People from Columbia, Tennessee
Year of birth missing (living people)
Living people